The Women's rhythmic individual hoop event took place on 14 October 2010 at the Indira Gandhi Arena.

Final

References
Results

Gymnastics at the 2010 Commonwealth Games
2010 in women's gymnastics